"High" is a song by English rock band the Cure, released as the lead single from their ninth album Wish on 16 March 1992. The track received mostly positive reviews and was commercially successful, reaching number one on the US Billboard Modern Rock Tracks chart, number six on the Irish Singles Chart, and number eight on the UK Singles Chart. It charted the highest in Portugal, where it peaked at number two, and in Australasia, reaching number five in Australia and number four in New Zealand; it is the band's highest-charting single in both countries.

Critical reception
An article published by Evening Standard ranked "High" as the 11th-best Cure song, calling its lyrics "dexterous and playful" and describing the song in its entirety as a "lovable thing". Larry Flick of Billboard also gave the song a positive review, calling it "subtle but infectious". Conversely, Michael Gallucci of Diffuser described the song as "kinda blah".

Track listings
7-inch single
A. "High" – 3:34
B. "This Twilight Garden" – 4:43

12-inch single
A1. "High" (Higher mix)
B1. "This Twilight Garden"
B2. "Play"

Maxi-CD single
 "High" (single mix)
 "This Twilight Garden"
 "Play"
 "High" (Higher mix)

US CD single
 "High" (single mix) – 3:34
 "Open" – 6:51

Personnel
 Robert Smith – vocals, 6-string bass, keyboards
 Simon Gallup – bass
 Porl Thompson – guitar
 Boris Williams – drums
 Perry Bamonte – 6-string bass, keyboard
 Mark Saunders – remixing

Charts

Weekly charts

Year-end charts

See also
 Number one modern rock hits of 1992

References

External links
 

1992 singles
1992 songs
The Cure songs
Fiction Records singles
Song recordings produced by David M. Allen
Songs written by Boris Williams
Songs written by Perry Bamonte
Songs written by Porl Thompson
Songs written by Robert Smith (musician)
Songs written by Simon Gallup